The Gorilla (1930) is an American pre-Code mystery-comedy film produced by First National Pictures, distributed by Warner Bros., and directed by Bryan Foy. It stars Joe Frisco, Harry Gribbon, Walter Pidgeon and Lila Lee, and is based on the 1925 play of the same name by Ralph Spence. The 1930 film version was a sound remake of the 1927 silent version, also produced by First National Pictures.

The Gorilla is presumed lost; none of its visual elements are known to survive. The soundtrack, which was recorded on Vitaphone disks, may survive in private hands.

Plot
The story opens with a murder supposedly caused by a gorilla. Police catch only a glimpse of a gorilla's shadow, cast against a brick wall, before it disappears. When Cyrus Stevens (Maxwell) receives a note that the gorilla will arrive at his home before midnight, he hires detectives Garrity (Frisco) and Mulligan (Gribbon) to help protect him.

Stevens lives with his ward, Alice Denby (Lee), who is in love with Arthur Marsden (Pidgeon). Garrity and Mulligan stand guard outside the house until close to midnight, but do not see anything suspicious. Mulligan persuades Garrity to don a gorilla suit to entice the gorilla and trap him. To avoid being shot by those searching for the gorilla, Garrity wears a white ribbon around his neck.

While Garrity searches for the gorilla, the real gorilla appears and chases Mulligan, who climbs a tree and calls for help, but no one arrives. The gorilla breaks off a branch of the tree and Mulligan falls to the ground. The gorilla then finds Garrity, who has hidden in another tree. He reaches for Garrity, but simply removes the white ribbon and places it around his own neck. The real gorilla then wanders freely, leaving Garrity, unable to remove his costume's head, hunted as the real gorilla.

Garrity finally removes the head, but is still pursued and shot at in the dark until he reaches a lighted area. Marsden, who turns out to be an undercover detective, discovers that Stevens, in a gorilla suit of his own, is the real murderer.

Cast
Joe Frisco as Garrity 
Harry Gribbon as Mulligan 
Walter Pidgeon as Arthur Marsden  
Lila Lee as Alice Denby
Purnell Pratt as The Stranger 
Edwin Maxwell as Cyrus Stevens
Roscoe Karns as Simmons
William H. Philbrick as Jeff
Landers Stevens as Inspector
Charles Gemora as The Gorilla

See also
List of lost films

References

External links

1930 films
First National Pictures films
American comedy mystery films
Warner Bros. films
American black-and-white films
Lost American films
1930s comedy mystery films
American comedy horror films
1930s comedy horror films
1930 lost films
Lost comedy horror films
1930 comedy films
1930s English-language films
1930s American films